Libertador is a municipality of Sucre, Venezuela. The capital is Tunapuy.

References

Municipalities of Sucre (state)